Aughrusbeg Lough is a freshwater lake in the west of Ireland. It is located in the Connemara area in west County Galway.

Geography and hydrology
The lake is oligotrophic.

Natural history
Fish species in Aughrusbeg Lough include three-spined stickleback, rudd, brown trout and the critically endangered European eel. The lake is part of the Aughrusbeg Machair and Lake Special Area of Conservation.

See also
List of loughs in Ireland

References

Aughrusbeg